Zerene is a genus of butterflies in the family Pieridae commonly called dogfaces. The closest living relative is the genus Colias. They are migratory.

Species
 Zerene cesonia (Stoll, 1790) – southern dogface
 Zerene eurydice (Boisduval, 1855) – California dogface

References

External links
Zerene

Coliadinae
Pieridae genera
Taxa named by Jacob Hübner